forskning.no (science and research) is an Oslo-based online newspaper established by the Research Council of Norway in 2002. It publishes news about science and research from Norway and abroad. The web site is run by Foreningen for drift av forskning.no, a non-profit organization which has 78 research institutions as members. forskning.no has its own writers and journalists and freelance writers. In addition articles are submitted by the research institutes and then edited by forskning.no staff before being published. Its English-language version is known as sciencenorway.no.

While the newspaper has owners, the editor and journalists choose what to write. forskning.no is an independent newspaper run after the rules of The Association of Norwegian Editors. They cooperate with the corresponding Danish online newspaper, videnskab.dk, among other things about the English-language news service, sciencenordic.com, which was established in 2011.

forskning.no has an average of 33,000 visits per day in January 2016 and 1 million visits per month. Nina Kristiansen is the editor in charge since 2007. She took over after Erik Tunstad.

History

forskning.no was launched in 2002. The site's initial editor was Erik Tunstad at the time and first managing director was Steinar Q. Andersen.

The site was launched in 2002 after the initiative of the Research Council of Norway, and a total of 12 research institutions participated in the establishment. The idea was simple: to establish a dissemination information campaign, and then hand over the control to an independent editorial staff, working under The Association of Norwegian Editors and in accordance with Code of Ethics of the Norwegian Press.

An editorial of three, later five people, was established in a small yellow house at Mølla in Oslo. Ingrid Spilde and Arnfinn Christensen are the only ones left from the beginning, who are still working in forskning.no today. Today there are 77 research and education institutions that participate in the cooperation. These can also make submissions, which is considered and edited, and which is clearly marked with the institution as the sender. The editorial staff consists of 14 people: journalists, editor, editorial director and editors.

Awards

 forskning.no won the Research Council of Norway's Award for Excellence in Communication of Science.
 Editor Nina Kristansen won the Editor Award in 2016. The award is handed out by Den Norske Fagpresses Forening (The Norwegian Professional Media Union).
 The forskning.no journalists Ingrid Spilde and Ida Kvittingen won the ViS-award for critical, insightful and sound research journalism for a series of articles they wrote for forskning.no about the science you don't get to read. The prize is handed out by Vitenskapsakademiet i Stavanger (The science academy in Stavanger)

Owners

List of owners:

 Akershus University Hospital 
 BI Norwegian Business School
 Centre for Advanced Study at the Norwegian Academy of Science and Letters
 Christian Michelsen Research 
 Eastern Norway Research Institute
 Fafo Foundation 
 GenØk – Centre for Biosafety 
 Geological Survey of Norway 
 Hedmark University College  
 High North Research Centre for Climate and the Environment 
 Institute for Church, Religion, and Worldview Research
 Institute for Rural and Regional Research (RURALIS)
 Institute Of Marine Research (NIFES) 
 International Research Institute of Stavanger (IRIS) 
 Molde University College 
 Nasjonalforeningen for folkehelsen 
 Nasjonal kompetansetjeneste for aldring og helse 
 Nasjonal kompetansetjeneste for kvinnehelse 
 National Development Center For Children And Young Adults (NUBU) 
 Nofima 
 Nord University 
 NordForsk 
 Nordland Research Institute 
 Northern Research Institute (Norut)
 Norwegian Academy of Music 
 Norwegian Biodiversity Information Centre
 Norwegian Centre for Organic Agriculture (NORSØK)
 Norwegian Centre for Violence and Traumatic Stress Studies (NKVTS) 
 Norwegian Computing Center 
 Norwegian Defence Research Establishment 
 Norwegian Geotechnical Institute 
 Norwegian Institute for Air Research (NILU)
 Norwegian institute for Bioeconomics (NIBIO) 
 Norwegian Institute for Cultural Heritage Research (NIKU)
 Norwegian Institute for Nature Research (NINA) 
 Norwegian Institute for Social Research 
 Norwegian Institute For Water Research (NIVA) 
 Norwegian Institute of International Affairs 
 Norwegian Institute of Marine Research
 Norwegian Institute of public health (NIPH) 
 Norwegian Mapping and Cadastre Authority 
 Norwegian Polar Institute 
 Norwegian Police University College
 Norwegian Radiation Protection Authority 
 Norwegian School of Economics 
 Norwegian School of Sport Sciences 
 Norwegian Space Centre 
 Norwegian University of Life Sciences (NMBU)
 Norwegian University of Science and Technology (NTNU)
 Norwegian Veterinary Institute 
 Norwegian Water Resources and Energy Directorate (NVE) 
 Opplysningskontoret for Meieriprodukter 
 Oslo and Akershus University College 
 Oslo University Hospital 
 RBUP Øst og Sør 
 Regional Research Funds In Norway (RFF) 
 Research Council of Norway 
 Simula Research Laboratory 
 Statped 
 Tannhelsetjenestens kompetansesenter Øst  
 The Finance Market Fund 
 The Foundation for Scientific and Industrial Research (SINTEF)
 The Norwegian Association of Local and Regional Authorities (KS)
 The Norwegian Centre for International Cooperation in Education (SIU) 
 The Norwegian Directorate of eHealth (NDE)
 The Norwegian National Research Ethics Committees 
 The Norwegian Seafood Research Fund (FHF)
 University Centre in Svalbard (UNIS) 
 University College of Southeast Norway 
 University of Agder 
 University of Bergen 
 University of Oslo 
 University of Stavanger 
 University of Tromsø 
 Western Norway University of Applied Sciences
 Western Norway Research Institute 
 Østfold University College

Former owners
 Oslo School of Architecture and Design 
 MF Norwegian School of Theology 
 The Centre of Competence on Rural Development 
 Western Norway University of Applied Sciences 
 Lillehammer University College
 Sogn og Fjordane University College 
 Gender research 
 Norwegian Cancer Society 
 Norwegian Institute for Urban and Regional Research (NIBR) 
 Trøndelag Research and Development AS 
 The University Graduate Center (UNIK)

References

External links
 forskning.no
 Videnskab.dk
 Sciencenordic.com
 Code of Ethics of the Norwegian Press

Newspapers published in Norway
Publications established in 2002
2002 establishments in Norway
Organisations based in Oslo
Research Council of Norway
Mass media in Oslo
Norwegian news websites